Robert Schlesinger is an American writer and liberal commentator focusing on politics and political communications.

Biography
A New York City native, he is a graduate of Middlebury College. He now lives in Alexandria, Virginia, with his wife and their two sons. He is the youngest son of the late historian Arthur M. Schlesinger Jr. and the brother of Stephen Schlesinger and Christina Schlesinger. He is a descendant of the Irish revolutionaries Robert Emmet (for whom he is named) and Thomas Addis Emmet.

Professional career
Schlesinger has worked at the Center for Public Integrity as a researcher, then at The Hill as a reporter and political editor, at Voter.com as chief congressional correspondent, and as a Washington, DC reporter for The Boston Globe. He was most recently managing editor for opinion at U.S. News & World Report. After leaving U.S. News, he opened Schlesinger Communications, a firm which specializes in ghostwriting. His book, White House Ghosts: Presidents and Their Speechwriters, was published in 2008. His work has appeared in numerous publications, including NBC News' Think opinion section, The Washington Monthly, The Washington Post, The Weekly Standard, People, Mother Jones, The American Conservative and The New Republic among other publications. He cohosted the Bipodisan podcast, along with Jean Card, a Republican former cabinet speechwriter, from 2019 to 2021.

References

External links

Appearance on The Daily Show

Year of birth missing (living people)
Living people
American bloggers
American male journalists
Middlebury College alumni
Journalists from Washington, D.C.
Journalists from New York City
21st-century American non-fiction writers
American male bloggers